José Antonio Zapata may refer to:

José Antonio Zapata, (died 1839), Mexican colonel, namesake of Zapata, Texas
José Antonio Zapata (painter) (1762–1837), Spanish painter